Kunwar Sarvraj Singh (born 14 August 1952) is an Indian politician for the Aonla (Lok Sabha Constituency) in Uttar Pradesh during the eleventh, thirteenth, and fourteenth Lok Sabha. He was first elected as a member of the Samajwadi Party.

References

1952 births
Living people
Politicians from Bareilly
India MPs 2004–2009
Politicians from Lucknow
Samajwadi Party politicians
Indian National Congress politicians
Lok Sabha members from Uttar Pradesh
India MPs 1999–2004
People from Bareilly district
Indian National Congress politicians from Uttar Pradesh